Dave Leip's Atlas of U.S. Presidential Elections is a website that provides tables, graphs, and maps for presidential (1789–present), senatorial (1990 and onwards), and gubernatorial (1990 and onwards) elections. Data include candidates, parties, popular and electoral vote totals, and voter turnout. County-level data is available for many years, and all data are compiled from official sources. Leip's Atlas has been cited as a "preferred source for election results" by statistician and political pundit Nate Silver.

Operations
The web site was created by electrical engineer David Leip from Massachusetts. Leip began the Atlas of U.S. Presidential Elections as a hobby after the 1992 presidential election, while he was attending graduate school at MIT. The site was significantly amended in 1997, beginning with data from the 1996 presidential election, acquiring information from the Secretary of state offices which published election data on-line from 1996 onwards. The site was originally hosted by MIT, but moved to its own URL, uselectionatlas.org in 1998. A part of the website is the Atlas Forum, a debate and discussion chamber on U.S. and international elections and politics as well as electoral mapmaking.

Despite the general media coloring Democrats as blue and Republicans as red, the Atlas website uses blue for Republicans and red for Democrats. The website predates the conventional color scheme, which has only been in place since 2000; see Red states and blue states.

Reception
PolitiFact.com has referred the web site as "indispensable",  while The Washington Post describes it as "great-if-not-super-modern" and notes that "perhaps more interestingly, it lets us figure out which voters actually mattered -- that is, the votes cast before and after a candidate clinched the nomination."

The site has been used a reference for U.S. election and political data by major media outlets including U.S. News & World Report, The Atlantic, The Wall Street Journal, Roll Call, CBS News, Politico, and Men's Health.

References

External links
 

American political websites
Electoral geography of the United States
 
Political history of the United States
Presidential elections in the United States